StarGaze was an annual charity event that was promoted by Buffalo Bills quarterback Jim Kelly from 1992 to 1995.

Format
StarGaze was originally conceived after Jim Kelly held a million-dollar football toss as part of his private Jim Kelly Celebrity Classic golf tournament, and it was decided to open the football toss portion of the weekend to the public. Kelly started the golf tournament at East Aurora Country Club in 1987 to raise money for his Kelly for Kids Foundation, and all proceeds from StarGaze went towards the organization.

The public events beginning in 1992 featured an All-Star Softball Game, Home Run Derby, and finished with the Million Dollar Shootout.

The object of the Shootout was to throw a football 30 yards into a hole two inches larger than the width of the ball, with the winner splitting $1,000,000 between themselves and the charity of their choice. No celebrity won the $1,000,000 in the history of the events. However, for the final public event in 1995, the Shootout was changed to a 20-yard throw for a trip to Australia. Nate Turner successfully completed the 20-yard throw and won the trip.

Kelly continued hosting his annual celebrity golf tournament at East Aurora Country Club, and in 2006 it moved to Terry Hills Golf Course in Batavia, NY.

History

Jim Kelly Shootout and Carnival of Stars
June 7, 1992 in Buffalo, New York (Pilot Field)

14.500 in attendance / $150,000 raised 

Hosted by Cris Collinsworth and Paul Maguire

StarGaze 1993
June 13, 1993 in Buffalo, New York (Pilot Field)

 10,000 in attendance /  $100,000 raised

Hosted by Paul Maguire and Ray Combs

StarGaze 1994
June 5, 1994 in Amherst, New York (University at Buffalo Stadium)

 10,000 in attendance / $100,000 raised

Hosted by Ray Combs and Will McDonough

StarGaze 1995
June 11, 1995 in Rochester, New York (Silver Stadium)

7,000 in attendance / $150,000 raised

Hosted by Paul Maguire and Ray Combs

References

External links
Kelly for Kids Foundation

Annual events in New York (state)
Annual sporting events in the United States
Charity events in the United States
History of Buffalo, New York
Recurring sporting events established in 1992
Recurring sporting events disestablished in 1995
Sports in Buffalo, New York